The following elections occurred in the year 1816.

 1816 French legislative election

North America

United States
 1816 New York gubernatorial election
 United States House of Representatives elections in New York, 1816
 1816 and 1817 United States House of Representatives elections
 1816 United States presidential election
 1816 and 1817 United States Senate elections

See also
 :Category:1816 elections

1816
Elections